The 2006 Millsaps Majors football team represented Millsaps College as a member of the Southern Collegiate Athletic Conference during the 2006 NCAA Division III football season.

Coach DuBose's first season got off to a rocky start. The Majors were hammered 52-28 by Mississippi College in the season-opening Backyard Brawl game, which returned after a one-year hiatus in 2005. The Majors then lost their next two games in heartbreaking fashion, by a combined total of four points. However, DuBose's team managed an incredible turn-around that shocked the SCAC, when the team went on to win their next six games to set up a showdown with perennial SCAC juggernaut Trinity in the season finale. Each team entered the contest at 5-0 in conference play, meaning the winner would receive the SCAC's automatic playoff bid and claim the SCAC title outright.

Trinity, ranked 21st nationally, was heavily favored to end the Majors' incredible run; the Tigers had won or shared 13 consecutive SCAC championships dating back to 1993 (Millsaps and Trinity shared the title in 1996) and were winners of five straight contests against the Majors, including a 41-0 blowout the previous year in San Antonio. However, the Majors stunned the Tigers 34-12, emerging victorious behind a three touchdown-performance from senior wide receiver Chris Jackson, who returned two punts for scores and caught another. The win gave Millsaps a 6-0 final record in conference play (7-3 overall), earning the Majors their third SCAC title (their first won outright) and the league's automatic playoff bid for the first time. The tournament appearance was just the second in the program's history, the first since 1975.

DuBose was named the SCAC's 2006 "Coach of the Year" for engineering the Majors' remarkable turn-around. Sophomore quarterback Juan Joseph was named the league's "Offensive Player of the Year" and Chris Jackson was honored as the league's "Special Teams Player of the Year" and named a first team All-American for his role as the team's return specialist. In all, 20 Majors were named to the All-SCAC first team, second team and honorable mention lists.

Schedule

References

Millsaps
Millsaps Majors football seasons
Millsaps Majors football